The Sri Lanka Exhibition and Convention Centre (SLECC) is a professional convention centre, located in Colombo. It provides a  air-conditioned, multi-functional exhibition space for hosting events, trade-shows, seminars, conferences and meetings.

History 
The Sri Lanka Exhibition and Convention Centre started operation in 1994 under the approval of the Board of Investment (BOI). It is an investment project of the Pico Far East Holdings Limited to build exhibition and convention in Sri Lanka, which spearheaded by Sri Lanka Convention Bureau (SLCB) under the aegis of the Ministry of Tourism.

Past Events 
 Colombo International Yarn and Fabric Show (CIFS)
 EDEX Expo | Higher Educational Exhibition
 Hotel, Hospitality and Food Sri Lanka (HHF Asia)
 Saree Festival

References 

Convention centres in Sri Lanka
Buildings and structures in Colombo